Jeff Martens could refer to:

Jef Martens, Belgian musician, born 1975, better known as Basto
Jeff Martens (Canadian sportsman), a player for the Hamilton Tiger-Cats in the Canadian Football League